Bearers of the Black Staff is a fantasy novel by American writer Terry Brooks, released on August 24, 2010, as the first of a two-part series called the Legends of Shannara. In the series' timeline, it falls between the Genesis of Shannara trilogy and the First King of Shannara. It takes place 500 years after the events of the final Genesis book, The Gypsy Morph. The people who were saved by Hawk's magic are able to head out into the World once again, since the effects of nuclear holocaust have dissipated.

The sequel to this novel is the 2011 novel, The Measure of the Magic.

Synopsis
As described by Cristina Donati of FantasyMagazine (translated),

References 

Shannara novels
2010 American novels
High fantasy novels
Del Rey books